The Olympic Elk is a 1952 American short documentary film directed by James Algar and produced by Walt Disney as part of the True-Life Adventures series of nature documentaries.

Summary
A photographic study of the Olympic elk which abound on the Olympic Peninsula in Washington describes the life of the herd in winter quarters in the rain forest; the trek to summer feeding grounds; and the placid summer existence of the herd which culminates in the September mating season.

Cast
 Winston Hibler as Narrator

References

External links

RKO Pictures short films
1952 documentary films
1952 short films
American short documentary films
1950s English-language films
1950s short documentary films
Disney documentary films
Documentary films about nature
Short films directed by James Algar
Disney short films
Films about deer and moose
Films with screenplays by Winston Hibler
1950s American films